In enzymology, a long-chain-fatty-acyl-glutamate deacylase is an enzyme that catalyzes the chemical reaction

N-long-chain-fatty-acyl-L-glutamate + H2O  a long-chain carboxylate + L-glutamate

Thus, the two substrates of this enzyme are N-long-chain-fatty-acyl-L-glutamate and H2O, whereas its two products are long-chain carboxylate and L-glutamate.

This enzyme belongs to the family of hydrolases, those acting on carbon-nitrogen bonds other than peptide bonds, specifically in linear amides.  The systematic name of this enzyme class is N-long-chain-fatty-acyl-L-glutamate amidohydrolase. Other names in common use include long-chain aminoacylase, long-chain-fatty-acyl-glutamate deacylase, long-chain acylglutamate amidase, and N-acyl-D-glutamate deacylase.

References

 

EC 3.5.1
Enzymes of unknown structure